Horror conventions are gatherings of the community of fans of various forms of horror including horror cinema, goth lifestyle, and occasionally science fiction and fantasy. Historically the focus has been on the cinematic form rather than literature and art, but this has broadened to include all forms in recent years. People in attendance at a horror convention are traditionally known as members of the convention; invited celebrities including film directors and stars are commonly known as guests of the convention, though many professionals including directors will simply attend as members.

Anatomy of a typical horror convention

Getting started

The first morning of most conventions, the "Opening Ceremonies" are held, where organizers and marquee guests are introduced and speeches might be made. Some conventions such as Weekend of Horrors will play horror-themed music and video.

Program
Panel-led discussions, or Panels, usually fill up the daytime hours of most conventions with typically one-hour discussions of topics related to horror films, horror literature, and fandom in general.

Evening entertainment often includes a combination of official and unofficial events, including dances, formal invitational dinners, and fandom-themed room parties. A bid party is a room party held to influence the choice of the location of a future convention by advertising its advantages.

A costume contest called a masquerade is often held where persons go on stage and compete for nominal prizes based on their skill in assembling and presenting horror-inspired outfits. This is truly more a "talent show" rather than the "fancy dress ball" that the term suggests (although British fandom sometimes uses the term "fancy dress").

Specific rooms
A Dealer's or Huckster's Room is available, where merchants sell wares of interest to fans. These include books, action figures, prop replicas and t-shirts. Smaller conventions may simply have an informal Dealer's Row, a section of hotel rooms from which dealers sell goods, while larger conventions may have both an official dealer's room and an unofficial dealer's row.

Many conventions have video rooms, in which genre-related audiovisual presentations take place and/or films and trailers are shown.

Ending the event
Often the "Closing Ceremonies" on the convention's last day are dispensed with entirely. This omission is because such ceremonies would logically be held after scheduled events are over, and convention members are occupied with packing up and checking out of the hotel.

Ceremony or not, a dead dog party is likely to be held. This is the traditional winding-down party where few of the attendees are likely to have huge amounts of energy. This party is an attempt to ease people back into the real world outside of convention and can be an effective method of warding off the depression, which is often associated with the end of a major event. Analogies can be drawn to the decompression parties following large events such as Burning Man.

Notable horror conventions

 Arcana
 Crypticon
 Fangoria's Weekend of Horrors
 New York City's Horror-Fi Expo
 Fantastic Fest
 HorrorConUK
 Flashback Weekend
 For the Love of Horror
 Houston Horror Film Fest
 Fantasm Orlando
 Fright Night Film Fest
 HorrorHound Weekend
 House Of Horrors Oberhausen, Germany
 Monster-Mania Con
 Monsterpalooza
 Rue Morgue Festival of Fear
 ScareFest Horror & Paranormal Convention
 Shocka-Con Horror/Sci-Fi Convention
 Spooky Empire
 SPOOKALA
 Tampa Bay Screams
 Texas Frightmare Weekend
 World Horror Convention

References

External links 
 Slasher App Slasher Horror Events Calendar
 HorrorCons.com Database of past and future horror conventions
 Ominous-Events.com The Horror Fests and Cons Database
 GOBLINHAUS The GOBLINHAUS Horror & Haunted Attraction Convention Calendar
 MONSTER FEST MONSTER FEST - A FREE 1 day "mini-con"
 MONSTER BASH International Classic Horror Movie Conference
 Horror-Fi Expo 2

 
Horror fiction